Gary Dale Batton (born December 15, 1966) is a tribal administrator and politician, the current and 47th Chief of the Choctaw Nation of Oklahoma. It is the third-largest federally recognized tribe and second-largest reservation in total area.

Batton was appointed as Chief on April 28, 2014, upon Chief Gregory E. Pyle's retirement. He was elected as Chief in his own right in a general election on July 11, 2015, with 86.5% of the vote. In 2019, Batton was unopposed in seeking a second full term.

Early life and career
Batton was born on December 15, 1966, in Wichita, Kansas. His mother was a full-blood Choctaw, and his father was from West Virginia. His family moved to Oklahoma, where he graduated from Clayton High School in Clayton, Oklahoma in 1985. He attended Southeastern Oklahoma State University, graduating in 1989 with a bachelor's degree in Business Management.

Batton had begun working for the Choctaw Nation in 1987 as a clerk in the Purchasing Department. Upon graduating from SOSU, he was selected for the position of deputy director of the Choctaw Nation Housing Authority.

In 1997 he was chosen as executive director of the Choctaw Nation Health Services Authority. Upon the retirement of Assistant Chief Mike Bailey in May 2007, Batton was selected as Assistant Chief. During his career as executive director of the Choctaw Nation Health Services Authority, Batton assisted by adding, replacing, and expanding clinics as well as enhancing the treatment of alcohol and drug abuse.

After the retirement of Chief Gregory E. Pyle in April 2014, after he had served 17 years in office and 13 years as Assistant Chief, Batton was appointed by the tribal council as acting Chief.

At the time the tribe was embroiled in allegations of corruption by contractors and a tribal officer related to construction projects, including one for a casino. Neither Pyle nor Batton were charged in relation to this federal case. By November 2014, six men had pleaded guilty in a "fraudulent purchase of $8.5 million in steel for a casino project." Jason Brett Mrrida, executive director of Construction, was found guilty on November 20, 2014, of six counts of a seven-count indictment.

The following year, Batton was elected as Chief in his own right in the general election on July 11, 2015, with 86.5% of the vote. He was sworn in as Chief of the Choctaw Nation on September 7, 2015, for a four-year term. The person occupying this office may be elected to an unlimited number of four-year terms. Batton filed to run for a second term in the 2019 election, where he was reelected as Chief of the Choctaw Nation of Oklahoma.

Personal life
Batton lives in Clayton, Oklahoma with his wife, Angie. They have two children and two grandchildren.

References

1966 births
Choctaw Nation of Oklahoma people
Living people
Choctaw Nation of Oklahoma politicians
Oklahoma Republicans
People from Pushmataha County, Oklahoma
Politicians from Wichita, Kansas
20th-century Native Americans
21st-century Native Americans